The Huelva Public Library is a public library located in Huelva, Spain.

See also 
 List of libraries in Spain

References

External links 
 Huelva Public Library

Public libraries in Spain
Huelva
Education in Andalusia